The Vigilantes in Masks is a 2010 Chinese television series based on folktales of a Robin Hood-style hero who lived in the Ming Dynasty. Produced by Chinese Entertainment Shanghai, the series star Wallace Huo, Cecilia Liu, Ma Tianyu and Shi Xingyu. Previous adaptations include a 1960 Hong Kong television series, a 1994 film, a 2005 TVB production, a 2008 SBS South Korean television drama, Iljimae, and a 2009 MBC South Korean adaptation The Return of Iljimae.

Synopsis
Li Gexiao is a master in martial arts with intelligence matching his skills. Previously a high ranking Embroidered Uniform Guard with great judicial authority. However, after framed with a crime he had not commit and his family executed, the former marshal had no choice but to become a fugitive. Years later (beginning of the series), he came out of hiding to help a former colleague recover a cargo of stolen gold for disaster relief. He and three chivalrous strangers, thief Yan Sanniang, grifter He Xiaomei, and strongman Chai Hu, unite to form a heroic band of masked vigilantes called "Yi Zhi Mei" (One Blossom Branch) that steals from the wealthiest and the most corrupted to help the people in need, always leaving a plum flower at the scene as their calling card. In the jianghu, they are also a renowned team that fights against injustice, corruption and oppression by the government.

Cast

Soundtrack
 Tiandi Meihua Kai (天地梅花開; The Opening of the World and Plum Blossoms) by Hu Ge
 Tiantang Niao (天堂鳥; Bird of Paradise) by Zheng Jiajia

External links
  The Vigilantes In Masks on Sina.com

Chinese wuxia television series
2010 Chinese television series debuts
2011 Chinese television series endings
Television series set in the Ming dynasty
Serial drama television series
Television series by Tangren Media
Television shows based on Chinese novels
Shenchuan Television original programming
Jiangsu Television original programming